The Missouri Valley Intercollegiate Athletic Association (MVIAA) was a college athletic conference and the second college conference formed upon its foundation on January 12, 1907. The conference was initially formed by an agreement among representatives of five schools, the University of Kansas, University of Missouri, University of Nebraska, University of Iowa, and Washington University in St. Louis. Iowa State College and Drake University, both joined the conference together in March 1907. The University of Iowa, which had only taken part in football, left after the 1908 season and remained a member of the Big Ten Conference, but other schools joined the MVIAA, including Kansas State University, Grinnell College, the University of Oklahoma, and Oklahoma A&M.

In 1928, the conference split apart into two conferences, both of which claimed to be the legitimate heir to the MVIAA's history. Six schools — Iowa State, Kansas, Kansas State, Missouri, Nebraska, and Oklahoma — reorganized under the MVIAA name. This conference, popularly known as the "Big Six Conference" at the time and later as the Big Seven Conference, would eventually evolve into the Big Eight Conference. Drake, Grinnell, WashU, and Oklahoma A&M formed the Missouri Valley Conference, which retained the same administrative staff as the MVIAA. Until the Big Eight disbanded in 1996, both conferences claimed 1907 as their founding date and the same history through May 1928. To this day, it has never been definitively established which conference was the original.

Members

Final pre-split members

 Notes

Previous member

See also
1927 Missouri Valley Intercollegiate Athletic Association football season

References

Sports organizations established in 1907
Sports in the Midwestern United States
Missouri Valley Conference
Big Eight Conference